Pseudothyretes carnea is a moth of the subfamily Arctiinae. It was described by George Hampson in 1898. It is found in Angola, the Democratic Republic of the Congo and Gabon.

References

 

Syntomini
Moths described in 1898